Live was the first live record (fifth album overall) by The Sensational Alex Harvey Band, released in 1975. It features a cover version of the Tom Jones song "Delilah". Donald A. Guarisco of AllMusic writes "Live is a double-triumph for the Sensational Alex Harvey Band because it functions both as a strong live souvenir for the group's fans and also as a solid introduction to the group's highlights for the novice".

Track listing
"Fanfare (Justly, Skillfully, Magnanimously)" (Derek Wadsworth) – 1:24
"Faith Healer" (Alex Harvey, Hugh McKenna) – 6:50
"Tomahawk Kid" (Harvey, David Batchelor, H. McKenna) – 5:50
"Vambo" (Harvey, H. McKenna) – 9:25
"Give My Compliments To The Chef" (Harvey, H. McKenna, Zal Cleminson) – 7:05
"Delilah" (Les Reed, Barry Mason) – 5:17
"Framed" (Jerry Leiber, Mike Stoller) – 11:04

Personnel

The Sensational Alex Harvey Band
 Alex Harvey – lead vocals, guitar
 Zal Cleminson – guitar
 Chris Glen – bass guitar
 Hugh McKenna – keyboards, synthesizer
 Ted McKenna – drums

Technical
 David Batchelor – producer
 John Punter – engineer
 Dougie Thompson – assistant engineer
 Dave and Alan Field – sleeve
 Ian Dickson, Steve Joester, Tom Busby – cover photography

Charts

Certifications

References

The Sensational Alex Harvey Band albums
1975 live albums
Atlantic Records live albums
Vertigo Records live albums
Albums recorded at the Hammersmith Apollo